László Wukovics (born 22 January 1970 in Budapest) is a former Hungarian international footballer.

References

1970 births
Living people
Hungarian footballers
Hungary under-21 international footballers
Hungary international footballers
Kategoria Superiore players
Expatriate footballers in Albania
Hungarian expatriate sportspeople in Albania
Association football forwards
Footballers from Budapest
Ferencvárosi TC footballers
Újpest FC players
Dunaújváros FC players
III. Kerületi TUE footballers
Budapest Honvéd FC players
KF Tirana players